Konrad Schily (born 7 November 1937 in Bochum) was from 2005 to 2009 a member of the German parliament, the Bundestag. He is a neurologist and co-founder of the Witten/Herdecke University, Germany's first private university that opened in 1982. He was the university's president from 1982 to 1999 and from 2002 to 2004.

Schily was a member of the Social Democratic Party of Germany (SPD), but in 2003 he became a member of the Innovationskreis NRW liberal, a think tank of the centrist party Free Democratic Party (FDP). In 2005 Schily became a member of the FDP. He was elected to the Bundestag the same year.

Family
Konrad Schily is the youngest of five children. He is married and has four children. His brother is Otto Schily, the former German Minister of the Interior.

External links 
 Official site

1937 births
Living people
People from Bochum
People from the Province of Westphalia
Social Democratic Party of Germany politicians
Members of the Bundestag for North Rhine-Westphalia
German neurologists
Heads of universities in Germany
Waldorf school alumni
Officers Crosses of the Order of Merit of the Federal Republic of Germany
Members of the Bundestag 2005–2009
Members of the Bundestag for the Free Democratic Party (Germany)